MobileWalla is a Singapore-based web-based search portal for applications targeted at mobile devices. It was founded on 7 March 2011 by Dr. Anindya Datta, a professor with the School of Computing, National University of Singapore. The portal is the first ever deep search and discovery engine for finding apps and uses around 114 variables for its rating system.

During 2016 US elections, the firm targeted evangelicals with cell's phone location in real time of 6 months preceding the election.

End of May 2020, the firm targeted George Floyd protesters located in New York, Los Angeles, Minneapolis and Atlanta and published a report 2 weeks after showing demographics data: ethnicity, gender and age distribution. Datta proffered that the report was prepared to satisfy the curiosity of its employees, and not on behest of any law enforcement or public agency. This however prompted various legislators to seek further clarifications with the company on the data itself.

References

Domain-specific search engines